The following is the filmography of American actor, singer, songwriter, record producer, and comedian Jamie Foxx.

Film

Television

Music videos

References

External links
 

American filmographies
Filmography
Male actor filmographies